Îles-de-Boucherville National Park is a provincial park of the province of Quebec. It is administered by Sépaq, the Société des établissements de plein air du Québec, which manages several Quebec parks and wildlife refuges. All provincial parks in Quebec have used the term "national park" since 2002, but there is no connection to the federal national park system, administered by Parks Canada.

See also
 Charron Island
 Hochelaga Archipelago
 Îles de Boucherville
Montreal Archipelago Ecological Park
 List of islands of Quebec

References
This article was initially translated from the French Wikipedia.

External links

Îles-de-Boucherville National Park - official site

National parks of Quebec
Tourist attractions in Montérégie
Hochelaga Archipelago
Protected areas of Montérégie
Boucherville
Canada geography articles needing translation from French Wikipedia